James Roderick Moir (born 24 January 1959), better known by his stage name Vic Reeves, is an English comedian, artist, surrealist, musician, actor and television presenter, best known for his double act with Bob Mortimer as Reeves & Mortimer. He is known for his surreal sense of humour.

In 2003, Reeves and Mortimer were listed in The Observer as one of the 50 funniest acts in British comedy. In a 2005 poll to find the Comedians' Comedian, Reeves and Mortimer were voted the ninth-greatest comedy act ever by fellow comedians and comedy insiders.

Early life
Moir was born in Leeds, the son of Audrey (née Leigh) and James Neill Moir (1926–2004). At the age of five, he moved to Darlington, County Durham, with his parents and younger sister Lois. He attended Heathfield Infants and Junior School and went on to the nearby secondary school, Eastbourne Comprehensive in Darlington. After leaving school, Reeves undertook an apprenticeship in mechanical engineering at a factory in Newton Aycliffe. Eventually he moved to London, where he attended the Polytechnic of North London and Middlesex Polytechnic.

Career
Moir formed the Fashionable Five, a group of five friends (including Jack Dent, who ran the original Fan Club) who would follow bands like the Enid and Free onto stage, and perform pranks (including Reeves pretending to have a brass hand, and following a Terry Scott lookalike around Darlington town centre in single-file formation). Moir had an early breakthrough with the help of comedian Malcolm Hardee.

Before finding fame with his comedy, Moir was a member of several bands with many different names and musical styles, in which he usually played bass guitar and/or sang. He sold tapes of his early material in the back pages of NME magazine under the name International Cod. Mark Lamarr, later to become a team captain on Shooting Stars, was sent a tape of Moir's band Fan Tan Tiddly Span. When Moir appeared, as Vic Reeves, on Never Mind the Buzzcocks in 1998, Lamarr repeatedly played a sample from the song "Fantasia (Side A)" in an attempt to embarrass him.

In 1983, Moir began a part-time course at a local art college, developed his love of painting and eventually persuaded a local art gallery to stage an exhibition of his work. Although still primarily known as a comedian, Moir is gaining a reputation as an artist. His drawings and paintings have been used in his television shows and form a major part of his 1999 book, Sun Boiled Onions.

As Vic Reeves

Television and Radio

As well as working and performing in bands in London, including being an original member of the Industrial/Experimental band Test Dept and performing onstage with them at their debut gig (then leaving soon afterwards), Moir also joined the alternative comedy circuit under many different guises. These included a loudmouthed American called Jim Bell, a beat poet called Mister Mystery and eventually, "The North-East's Top Light Entertainer"- Vic Reeves, whose name is derived from two of his favourite singers, Vic Damone and Jim Reeves. His stage show Vic Reeves Big Night Out began life as a regular Thursday night gig at Goldsmith's Tavern, New Cross (now the New Cross House). Here, he met Bob Mortimer, a solicitor who attended the show and enjoyed it so much that he soon began to participate.

Reeves' television début came in December 1986 on Channel 4 Television's The Tube in a comedy game show segment called "Square Celebrities", suspended by a wire to ask the "celebrities" questions. His next appearance was on the short-lived chat/comedy show One Hour with Jonathan Ross in a game show segment known as Knock Down Ginger. Reeves' growing TV profile led to Big Night Out being given a slot on Channel 4 the following year. It was about this time that Reeves and Bob Mortimer rented a back room at Jools Holland's office/recording studio in Westcombe Park, Greenwich where they would spend hours writing material.

Reeves continued to work alongside Mortimer as a comedy duo in a series of 1990s programmes, The Smell of Reeves and Mortimer, Shooting Stars, and Bang, Bang, It's Reeves and Mortimer, some of which also featured future cast members of The Fast Show and Little Britain. A 1994 pilot written by Paul Whitehouse and Charlie Higson entitled The Honeymoon's Over was due to feature Chris Bell, a character from The Smell of Reeves and Mortimer; however, the series was never commissioned. The same year, Reeves made a guest appearance on the Radio 1 series Shuttleworth's Showtime, hosted by John Shuttleworth. Between August 1998 and May 1999, Reeves and Mortimer presented the Channel X produced BBC Saturday game show Families at War with Alice Beer.

Reeves played Marty Hopkirk in the BBC's 2000–2001 thriller series Randall and Hopkirk (Deceased), a revival of the original 1960s series, with Mortimer as Randall, Emilia Fox as Jeannie Hopkirk, and Tom Baker as Wyvern. In 2000, Reeves presented a series entitled, Vic Reeves Examines on UK Play, featuring celebrities such as Ricky Gervais, Johnny Vegas, Lauren Laverne and Emma Kennedy discussing a topic of their choice. The same year, Reeves presented a one-off radio show on BBC Radio 1, entitled Cock of the Wood.

In 2004 Reeves and his wife, Nancy Sorrell were both contestants in the fourth series of I'm a Celebrity... Get Me Out of Here!. He also appeared in the series Catterick with Mortimer appearing as several characters. In September 2005, Reeves hosted a show for Virgin Radio called Vic Reeves Big Night In produced by Mark Augustyn, for a short period on Wednesdays and Thursdays from 7.00pm.

Reeves presented a historical ten-part series, entitled Rogues Gallery, which was shown on the Discovery Channel (UK) in 2005, where he investigated, and portrayed Anne Bonny and Mary Read, Captain Kidd, Claude Duval, Jonathan Wild, Rob Roy, Colonel Blood, George Ransley, Deacon Brodie, Blackbeard and Dick Turpin. Sorrell also appeared in some episodes. Continuing in this vein, Vic Reeves' Pirates was shown on ITV West and, subsequently, on the History Channel in 2007. In May 2006, Reeves presented a programme on ITV Tyne Tees about Northeast comedy culture called It's Funny Up North with... Vic Reeves.

In 2007, Reeves hosted a show called Vic Reeves Investigates: Jack the Ripper. Reeves, with the help of historians and leading experts, tried to discover who Jack the Ripper was. At the end of the show, he came to the conclusion that Jack the Ripper was Francis Tumblety. On 8 May 2007, Reeves was the main presenter of Brainiac: Science Abuse during the fifth and sixth series, replacing Richard Hammond. Beginning in June 2007, Reeves presented a BBC Radio 2 panel game called Does the Team Think?. On 17 November 2007, Reeves appeared in a weekly sketch show on BBC Radio 2, entitled Vic Reeves' House Arrest. The show's premise was that he had been put under house arrest for "a crime he didn't commit", and each episode consists of the various events that take place in and around his house on a particular day. Mortimer plays his housecall-making hairdresser, Carl, while other performers include The Mighty Boosh star Noel Fielding as a local vagrant who comes to Reeves' door on a weekly basis looking for work, as well as Nancy Sorrell in multiple roles.

On 27 February 2008, Reeves announced that he and Mortimer were working together on a new sitcom about superheroes who get their powers through a malfunctioning telegraph pole. He also reiterated his desire to bring back Shooting Stars for a 6th series. Along with his son, Reeves is also featured in one edition of a factual series for Five, Dangerous Adventures for Boys, based on the best-selling book written by Conn and Hal Iggulden, The Dangerous Book for Boys.

In February 2009, Reeves appeared as presenter of the first episode of My Brilliant Britain, one of the new television shows commissioned for UKTV People channel's relaunch as Blighty. On 25 August 2009, Reeves appeared as a guest on BBC One's The One Show with Mortimer. Series 6 of Shooting Stars began airing on 26 August 2009 with Reeves and Mortimer, along with Ulrika Jonsson and Jack Dee as team captains. Reeves appeared as one of the guests in Reece Shearsmith's Haunted House, a light-hearted radio discussion show broadcast on BBC Radio 4 in two parts on either side of Halloween on 29 October 2009 and 5 November 2009.

In July 2011, Reeves and Mortimer released a selection of YouTube improvised comedy sketches, in association with Foster's. They released their "Afternoon Delight" clips every weekday afternoon in July.

In 2020, Reeves co-hosted the Netflix original, reality series The Big Flower Fight alongside Natasia Demetriou.

Advertising

Reeves has appeared in television advertisements, both with Mortimer and alone. He has done solo advertising work for a variety of products including Guinness, MFI, Müller Light, First Direct, Mars Bar, Fanta, Heinz Tomato Ketchup, Domestos bleach, Maryland Cookies, 888 Ladies and East Coast Trains. Reeves also advertised Jools Holland's 2006 album Moving Out to the Country. With Mortimer, he advertised Cadburys Boost and Churchill Insurance. Mortimer voiced the nodding bulldog, Churchill, and in early adverts, Reeves’ voice would ask questions about car insurance, to which Churchill replied with his catchphrase, “Oh, yes!” However, in 2005 Reeves was dropped from the adverts after being arrested on charges of drunk-driving.

Music
As part of early Big Night Out performances, Reeves would sometimes hand out promotional materials to the audience. On one occasion he handed out a 7" flexi disc of original song "The Howlin' Wind". Having surplus copies of the discs, Reeves passed them on to Darlington-based band Dan, who then included a copy of the disc with their album Kicking Ass at T.J.'s.

Album
I Will Cure You was Reeves' only album. It was released in 1991 by Island Records and peaked at No. 16 in the UK Albums Chart. It featured the Number One single "Dizzy" which was a collaboration with The Wonder Stuff. It included a mixture of covers and original songs in a variety of musical styles, many of which were originally introduced in Big Night Out. Along with "Dizzy", two other singles were released from the album, a cover of the Matt Monro song "Born Free" and a dance reworking of Christian hymn "Abide With Me" which reached No. 6 and No. 47 in the UK Singles Chart, respectively.

Singles

In 1995, Reeves and Mortimer released a cover of The Monkees song "I'm a Believer" with British band EMF which reached No. 3 in the UK Singles Chart. Reeves had a history with the track, having both sung it at the beginning of early Big Night Out performances in London, and opened the Channel 4 series with it. In the music video, which was directed by Reeves, the duo dress as Mike Nesmith and Davy Jones of The Monkees. On the CD release of the single, a studio version of "At This Stage I Couldn't Say" was included, a track originally sung by characters Mulligan and O'Hare in The Smell of Reeves and Mortimer. On the 7" release, the bonus track was "At Least We've Got Our Guitars", which was the opening song for the last episode of The Smell of Reeves and Mortimer.

In April 2007, the theme to British stop-motion animation Shaun the Sheep, sung by Reeves, was released as a single. The song reached No. 20 in the UK Singles Chart.

Contributions

In 1990 both Reeves and Mortimer contributed backing vocals to Jools Holland's "Holy Cow" (a Lee Dorsey cover). The track was included on Holland's album World of his Own and released as a single. Later, Reeves would advertise Holland's album Moving Out to the Country.

Also in 1990, Reeves provided backing vocals for former Smiths singer Morrissey's cover of "That's Entertainment", originally by The Jam. Reeves' vocals were not used in the final edit but he was thanked (as Jim Moir) in the sleeve notes of Morrissey's Sing Your Life single, which featured "That's Entertainment" as a bonus track. A fan of the Smiths, Reeves opened some episodes of Big Night Out with covers of the band's songs including "Sheila Take a Bow" which he intended to include a cover of on his album I Will Cure You. It did not make the final cut.

In 1992, Reeves contributed a track to Ruby Trax, a compilation album released by NME magazine to commemorate 40 years of the publication. He covered the Ultravox song "Vienna", but drastically altered the original lyrics.

In 1998, Reeves contributed to Twentieth-Century Blues: The Songs of Noel Coward, a tribute album featuring notable singers and bands such as Elton John, Sting, Robbie Williams and Paul McCartney. Reeves covered Coward's 1934 track "Don't Put Your Daughter on the Stage Mrs. Worthington", which was arranged by David Arnold for the album. The song, described by Reeves as "sinister", was initially recorded with all original verses intact, but as the last included foul language, it was edited out of the final release.

In 2000, Reeves' cover of "Ain't That a Kick in the Head?" was featured as a bonus track on the theme single to the Randall and Hopkirk (Deceased) series in which he starred. Reeves was originally to duet with Nina Persson (of the Cardigans), who provided vocals, but missed the final cut. A shortened version of Reeves' cover also featured in the series itself. Both Reeves and Mortimer appeared in the music video for the single.

Music videos

Other than the music videos for his own singles, Reeves has appeared in others. His first was the 1987 video for Shakin' Stevens' single "What Do You Want to Make Those Eyes at Me For". He was hired for the shoot and paid £10 for his appearance.

Reeves also appeared in the 1988 music video for Band of Holy Joy's song "Tactless". He introduces the band and can be seen at the bar part way through. The video was filmed in Deptford, London and original advertising posters for Big Night Out can be seen at the beginning.

Art
Moir has produced art both under the name Jim Moir and Vic Reeves. This reflects that his art, while serious, also combines with his comedy. Moir works in many media including painting, ceramics, photography and lino prints, and has a distinctive style. His work has been described as Dada-esque, surreal and sometimes macabre. For Moir, his art and comedy are different ways of expressing the same idea. He says "I think putting your imagination on canvas or a television screen is the same thing" and "I don't differentiate between painting, acting or comedy. I think everything I do is art." Moir has stated that he is an artist first and a comedian second, and that in ten years time he would like to be remembered for his art and writing, rather than his comedy.

Much like his comedy, Moir is not one to analyse his artworks. He has said that art should be "just for laughs" and that he dislikes people looking for statements in his work, because there are none. "If something makes me laugh, that's it." "I've done straight drawings and paintings ... and I haven't got as much pleasure out of them as if I'd done something that would make me laugh." His work has been described by artists Jake and Dinos Chapman as "able to command our laughter as a purgative, to encourage the viewer to leak at both ends". Artist Damien Hirst, a friend, has also described Moir's work as Reeves as an influence. This crossover of comedy and art often features within Reeves and Mortimer's television shows. A notable example is The Smell of Reeves and Mortimer first episode. Several of Reeves' drawings are featured, illustrating the lyrics of the opening song. (These drawings would later be published within his book Sun Boiled Onions.) As seen in the script book for the show, Reeves often drew sketches for the BBC's costume and set designers saying that "if we just tell them what we want, it never ends up looking like it does in our minds".

Background and education
Arts and crafts played a large part in Moir's upbringing. His mother and father, a seamstress and typesetter by trade, made extra money by selling handmade wooden crafts and ceramics at local markets. Building on these money-making schemes, Moir began charging for his own artistic services such as customising and painting his school friend's Haversack bags and elaborately embroidering clothing. Later he would go on to forge artworks his acquaintances liked with the aim of selling them to them. Wanting to study art, but being pressured into work, Moir began a five-year engineering apprenticeship at a factory in Newton Aycliffe with the aim of working in their technical drawings department.

After completing the apprenticeship, Moir applied to Goldsmiths College in London to study art, but failed to get a place. He has admitted to sneaking in and using their equipment regardless. In 1983 he completed a one-year foundation course at Sir John Cass College, where he is now an honorary graduate. Once leaving college, he worked as a curator at The Garden Gallery, an independent London gallery. It was there that he held his first art exhibition in 1985, with the help of a grant from Lewisham Council.

Published work and exhibitions
As Vic Reeves, he has released two books of his art, Sun Boiled Onions in 1999 and Vic Reeves' Vast Book of World Knowledge in 2009. His drawings also appear in his autobiography Me:Moir Volume One, and the published script book for The Smell of Reeves and Mortimer. He provided thirty illustrations for Random House's 2011 reprint of Jerome K. Jerome's classic story "Three Men in a Boat". He was also commissioned to create several celebrity drawings for Jools Holland's Channel 5 series Name That Tune.

Reeves has hosted several exhibitions of his artwork, including:
Sun Boiled Onions (2000) at the Percy Miller Gallery
Doings (2002) at the Whitechapel Gallery, London
My Family and Other Freaks (2007) at the Eyestorm Gallery, London
Where Eagles Tremble (2009) at Mews of Mayfair, London
Hot Valve Leak: Visual Ramblings of Vic Reeves (2013) at the Strand Gallery, London
Romans, Daisies, Ones and Twos (2022) at Northampton Museum and Art Gallery, Northampton

In 2010, a selection of Reeves' paintings were displayed at the Saatchi Gallery, London as part of an exhibition by charity The Art of Giving. He was also a judge for the charity's open art competition.

In 2012, Reeves took part in the Illuminating York festival. His illuminations, known as "Wonderland", were projected across a number of historic buildings including the Yorkshire Museum, St Mary's Abbey, and the ten-acre site of York Museum Gardens.

Filmography

Television

Reeves has appeared without Mortimer on a number of British television shows, primarily game shows, poll programmes and charity telethons. These include:

Books

 Vic Reeves' Vast Book of World Knowledge – a surreal encyclopaedia with text and artwork by Reeves. Atlantic Books, Released in October 2009.
 Vic Reeves Me:Moir (Volume One) – autobiography by Vic Reeves, Virgin Books, 2006
 Sunboiled Onions – diary, paintings and drawings by Vic Reeves, Penguin Books, 1999

Personal life
Reeves has four children, the eldest two by his first wife, Sarah Vincent; Reeves and Vincent were married in 1990 and divorced in 1999. He met his second wife, Nancy Sorrell, in 2001; the couple married on 25 January 2003. Sorrell gave birth to twin girls at the William Harvey Hospital in Ashford, Kent, on 25 May 2006. Reeves, Sorrell and their two girls live in Charing, near Ashford.

In September 2021, Reeves said he had been diagnosed with a vestibular schwannoma, a benign and non-cancerous brain tumour. The tumour is inoperable and has left him deaf in one ear.

References

External links
 
 Sky one Webpage about Vic Reeves Investigates: Jack the Ripper
 Vic Reeves Pirates
 Driving Ban For Comic Vic Reeves.
 Vic Reeves' author page, Conville and Walsh.

1959 births
Living people
People from Darlington
People from Leeds
Alumni of Middlesex University
Alumni of the University of North London
Comedians from Yorkshire
English television presenters
English male comedians
English autobiographers
English comedy musicians
English male television actors
English radio DJs
Virgin Radio (UK)
English comedy writers
British surrealist artists
I'm a Celebrity...Get Me Out of Here! (British TV series) participants
People from Charing